Teal Lake is a lake in the U.S. state of Michigan, located within the city of Negaunee. U.S. Highway 41/M-28 runs along the southern shoreline. Teal Lake is a public fishery with species such as largemouth bass and crappie living in its waters. It's also a popular swimming spot for people in the area.

See also
List of lakes in Michigan

References

Lakes of Michigan
Lakes of Marquette County, Michigan